Youniverse may refer to:

Youniverse (Rob Brown album), 1992
"Youniverse", title track from album above
Youniverse (Sawthis album), 2013
"Youniverse" (song), 2016 song by Swedish singer Molly Sandén from Melodifestivalen 2016

See also
Universe (disambiguation)